Hugo Sack (10 October 1860 – 23 June 1909) was a German engineer and industrialist.

Hugo Sack was born at Loeben, near Lützen, Saxony, in 1860, where his father, Rudolf Sack, owned an estate. In 1863 his family moved to Leipzig, where his father founded an engineering works for the manufacture of agricultural machinery, in which his son Hugo, after completing his school education, gained his first practical experience as an engineer.

He then went through a course of technical study at Mittweida and at the Karlsruhe Technical University. In 1882 he returned to his father's works, leaving them again soon after, however, to take up work in Westphalia and the Rhine province. He was subsequently commissioned by a British firm to erect a wire-drawing plant in Spain, near Bilbao, on which he continued for a year to act as manager.

On returning to Germany, he founded, in 1891, the engineering works of Sack and Kiesselbach at Rath, near Düsseldorf, which, under the skillful management of himself and his partner, soon developed into the important undertaking now so well known under that name. In 1899 he resigned the management of these works and founded at Rath the firm of Sack, Limited, to the development of which, to the end of his life, the whole of his activities were devoted. Here he found great scope for his remarkable talent as an engineer, and ample opportunity to realise his inventive genius in the construction of machinery of all kinds, and more especially rolling-mills. Among other inventions he was successful in perfecting the construction of the Sack Mill, a universal rolling-mill on lines proposed by him as far back as the 1880s, for parallel girders with wide flanges. A description of his universal mill and of its operation is contained in a paper read by him before the Iron and Steel Institute in 1889. He was elected a member of the Iron and Steel Institute in 1894.

Hugo Sack died suddenly on 23 June 1909 at Offdilln, near Düsseldorf.

References
 Journal of the Iron and Steel Institute, Vol. 80, 1909.

1860 births
1909 deaths
People from Lützen
Karlsruhe Institute of Technology alumni
Engineers from Saxony-Anhalt